Dad bod is a slang term in popular culture referring to a body shape mostly particular to middle-aged men. The phrase has been adopted in U.S. culture to refer to a male who was once particularly lean or fit, but over time has gained an noticeable amount of body fat, typically around the waist, leading to a "beer belly". The arms, legs, and chest are usually still toned.

Origins 
Mackenzie Pearson, a student at Clemson University, was the first to publish the term in a 2015 article titled "Why Girls Love The Dad Bod" on the crowdsourced publication platform Odyssey, but does not claim to have invented it, having heard it in many different social circles. Pearson routinely posted essays on her Odyssey account and soon started making them humorous.

The Mystery Science Theater 3000 episode covering Colossus and the Headhunters in 1994 used a similar phrase: "That's an assortment of dad bodies, huh."

Public conversation  
After Pearson's essay went viral, it was picked up by news media, including MSN, New York Daily News, The Washington Post, and Slate.

See also 
 Bear (gay culture)
 Somatotype and constitutional psychology

References 

Body image in popular culture
Men's culture